Penstemon venustus is a species of penstemon known by the common names Venus penstemon and alpine penstemon. It is native to the northwestern United States, where it grows in many types of open habitat. It is a spreading shrub growing erect to a maximum height near 80 centimeters. The thick, stiff leaves are lance-shaped, serrated, and up to 12 centimeters in length. The showy inflorescence bears many tubular lavender flowers, the largest nearly 4 centimeters long. The mouth of the flower and the staminode are covered in long, white hairs. This penstemon is cultivated for use in wilderness landscaping in its native habitat.

References

External links
Jepson Manual Treatment
Southwest Colorado Wildflowers
Photo gallery

venustus
Flora of the Northwestern United States
Flora without expected TNC conservation status